Stebbins Airport  is a state-owned public-use airport located in Stebbins, in the Nome Census Area, Alaska, United States.

Facilities 
It has one runway designated 5/23 with a 3,000 x 60 ft (914 x 18 m) gravel surface.

Airlines and destinations 

Prior to its bankruptcy and cessation of all operations, Ravn Alaska served the airport from multiple locations.

References

External links 
 FAA Alaska airport diagram (GIF)

Airports in the Nome Census Area, Alaska